The 2018 Campeonato Brasileiro Série D was a football competition held in Brazil, equivalent to the fourth division. The competition started on 21 April and ended on 4 August 2018.

Sixty-eight teams competed in the tournament. Sixty-four teams qualified from their state leagues and cups, and four relegated from the 2017 Campeonato Brasileiro Série C (ASA, Macaé, Mogi Mirim and Moto Club).

Ferroviário, Imperatriz, São José and Treze qualified for the semi-finals and were promoted to the 2019 Campeonato Brasileiro Série C.

Ferroviário won the title after defeating Treze in the final.

Teams

The following 68 teams qualified for the tournament:
São Paulo: 4 berths
Rio de Janeiro, Minas Gerais, Rio Grande do Sul, Santa Catarina, Paraná, Pernambuco, Goiás and Bahia: 3 berths each
All other federations: 2 berths each
Teams relegated from 2017 Campeonato Brasileiro Série C
ASA (Alagoas)
Macaé (Rio de Janeiro)
Mogi Mirim (São Paulo)
Moto Club (Maranhão)

Competition format
In the first stage, 68 teams were divided into seventeen groups of four, organized regionally. 32 teams (17 winners and 15 runners-up) qualified for the second stage. From the second stage on the competition was played as a knock-out tournament with each round contested over two legs.

First stage
In the first stage, each group played on a home-and-away round-robin basis. The winners of each group and the best 15 runners-up qualified for the second stage. The teams were ranked according to points (3 points for a win, 1 point for a draw, and 0 points for a loss). If tied on points, the following criteria would be used to determine the ranking: 1. Wins; 2. Goal difference; 3. Goals scored; 4. Head-to-head (if the tie was only between two teams); 5. Fewest red cards; 6. Fewest yellow cards; 7. Draw in the headquarters of the Brazilian Football Confederation (Regulations Article 12).

Group A1

Group A2

Group A3

Group A4

Group A5

Group A6

Group A7

Group A8

Group A9

Group A10

Group A11

Group A12

Group A13

Group A14

Group A15

Group A16

Group A17

Second stage
The Second stage was a two-legged knockout tie, with the draw regionalised.

Qualification and draw
The 32 qualifiers (17 group winners and 15 best performing group runners-up) were divided into two pots. Pot 1 contained the 16 best performing group winners. Pot 2 contained the worst performing group winner and the 15 qualifying group runners-up. In pot 1 the teams were numbered 1 to 16 in numerical order of the group they qualified from. In pot 2 the teams were numbered 17 to 32 in numerical order of the group they qualified from. In the case that one of the qualifying runners-up was from the same group as the worst performing group winner, both teams would be in pot 2 and the group winners would be numbered lower in sequence than the group runners-up.

The teams were ranked according to points. If tied on points, the following criteria would be used to determine the ranking: 1. Wins; 2. Goal difference; 3. Goals scored; 4. Draw in the headquarters of the Brazilian Football Confederation (Regulations Article 14).

To keep the draw regionalised Team 1 played Team 18, Team 2 played Team 17 and this pattern was repeated throughout the draw. The higher numbered team played at home in the first leg.

Ranking of group winners

Ranking of group runners-up

Qualification pots

Ties
The matches were played between 2 and 10 June.

|}

Third stage
The third stage was a two-legged knockout tie, with the draw regionalised. The ties were predetermined from the second stage, with the winners of second stage tie 1 playing the winners of second stage tie 2, etc. The teams were seeded according to their performance in the tournament with the higher-seeded team hosting the second leg.

Ties
The matches were played between 16 and 25 June.

|}

Final stages
The final stages were a two leg knockout competition with quarter-finals, semi-finals and finals rounds. The draw for the quarter-finals was seeded based on the table of results of all matches in the competition for the qualifying teams. First played eighth, second played seventh, etc. The top four seeded teams played the second leg at home. The four quarter-final winners were promoted to Série C for 2019. 

The draw for the semi-finals was seeded based on the table of results of all matches in the competition for the qualifying teams. First played fourth, second played third. The top two seeded teams played the second leg at home.

In the finals, the team with the best record in the competition played the second leg at home.

Quarter-finals seedings

Quarter-finals ties
The matches were played between 1 and 9 July.

|}

Semi-finals seedings

Semi-finals ties
The matches were played between 15 and 23 July.

|}

Finals seedings

Finals
The matches were played on 30 July and 4 August.

|}

Top goalscorers

References 

Campeonato Brasileiro Série D seasons
2